The 1985–86 season was the 71st season of the Isthmian League, which is an English football competition featuring semi-professional and amateur clubs from London, East and South East England. League consisted of three divisions. Division Two was divided into two sections.

Sutton United won the league for the second season in a row and finally were promoted to the Conference.

Premier Division

The Premier Division consisted of 22 clubs, including 19 clubs from the previous season and three new clubs:
 Farnborough Town, promoted as champions of Division One
 Kingstonian, promoted as runners-up in Division One
 Yeovil Town, relegated from the Alliance Premier League

League table

Division One

Division One consisted of 22 clubs, including 16 clubs from the previous season and six new clubs:

Two clubs relegated from the Premier Division:
 Harlow Town
 Leytonstone/Ilford

Two clubs promoted from Division Two North:
 Finchley
 Leyton-Wingate

Two clubs promoted from Division Two South:
 Grays Athletic
 Uxbridge

League table

Division Two North

Division Two North consisted of 20 clubs, including 16 clubs from the previous season and four new clubs:

 Clapton, relegated from Division One
 Hertford Town, relegated Division One
 Rainham Town, transferred from Division Two South
 Vauxhall Motors (Luton), joined from the South Midlands League

League table

Division Two South

Division Two South consisted of 20 clubs, including 15 clubs from the previous season and five new clubs:

 Flackwell Heath, transferred from Division Two North
 Marlow, transferred from Division Two North
 Metropolitan Police, relegated from Division One
 Southwick, joined from the Combined Counties League
 Woking, relegated from Division One

League table

See also
Isthmian League
1985–86 Northern Premier League
1985–86 Southern Football League

References

Isthmian League seasons
6